The Lands administrative divisions of Tasmania are the divisions of Tasmania into land districts and parishes for cadastral purposes, which are part of the lands administrative divisions of Australia. There are 20 land districts in Tasmania, although in the early nineteenth century there were several other systems, with 18 or 36 counties and 9 other divisions used, as well as hundreds. The land districts include the 18 former counties of the island of Tasmania which were renamed but retain the same boundaries, plus King Island and Flinders Island. The counties are referenced in the 1911 Encyclopædia Britannica, with Hobart described as being in Buckingham County, Launceston in Cornwall County and Beaconsfield in Devon County. The land districts are used for land titles today, while the Local Government Areas of Tasmania with cities and municipalities are used for political and administrative purposes.

Two counties 
Tasmania was initially divided into two counties on 24 September 1804; Buckingham in the south, and Cornwall in the north. Cornwall was governed by William Paterson, with Buckingham governed by David Collins.

20 land districts 
The 18 counties are shown in most maps of Tasmania in the mid to late nineteenth and earlier twentieth century. These counties are subdivided into parishes, and use the same names and boundaries that the land districts do, which are used for cadastral purposes today. The counties in the east and centre were proclaimed by 1850, while the western counties of Wellington, Russel, Montague, Lincoln, Franklin, Montgomery and Arthur were proclaimed during the 1850s.

Arthur Land District
Buckingham Land District
Cornwall Land District
Cumberland Land District
Devon Land District
Dorset Land District
Flinders Land District
Franklin Land District
Glamorgan Land District
Kent Land District
King Land District
Lincoln Land District
Monmouth Land District
Montagu Land District
Montgomery Land District
Pembroke Land District
Russell Land District
Somerset Land District
Wellington Land District, Tasmania
Westmoreland Land District

Other divisions 

Some maps show the administrative divisions which, by 1852, had covered the eastern part of the island, such as this 1831 map and 1852 map. These were the forerunners of Local Government Areas and in 1852 were Launceston, Norfolk Plains, Campbelltown, Clyde, Oatlands, Oyster Bay, New Norfolk, Richmond and Hobart Town.

Tasmania also had hundreds in the early days of the colony under Governor Arthur, with each  hundred being divided into four  parishes. A formal list of counties, hundreds and parishes was gazetted on 1 July 1836.

Early districts 

Some early maps of Van Diemen's Land show 36 divisions, not covering the whole island. These were used since the 1820s. These were known as districts and preceded the survey of counties and parishes. The announcement in 1822 of a Muster (Census) mentions 32 districts or towns by name:
Hobart Town, Argyle, Queenborough, Kingborough, Glenorchy, New Norfolk, Sorell, Clarence Plains, York, Cambridge, Ulva, Ormaig, Staffa, Caledon, Gloucester, Sussex, Harrington, Melville, Drummond, Strangford, Jarvis, Forbes, Green Ponds, Bath, Methven, Murray, Amherst, Lennox, Richmond, Norfolk Plains, Bathurst and Launceston.

This 1846 map shows the eleven counties thus far surveyed outlined, with parishes where existing. J. Archer's 1855 map shows a similar situation but with more bounded smaller subdivisions (including parishes) and the old unbounded district names superimposed, where appropriate. Subdivisions of counties include:

Georgetown
Launceston
South Esk
North Esk
Norfolk Plains
Western River
Lake River
Bathurst
Lennox
Richmond
Methven
Amherst
Staffa
Bath
Murray
Sorell
Green Ponds
Ormaig
Harrington
Gloucester
Caledon
Ulva
Jarvis
Strangford
Macquarie
New Norfolk
Melville
Drummond
Queenboro
Sussex
Clarence Plains
Cambridge
Forbes
Glenorchy
Argyle
Kingboro

References

 
History of Tasmania
Cadastral divisions Tasmania
Cadastral divisions